Honan may refer to:

 Henan, a Chinese province, often called "Honan" in older texts
 Honan, an Irish surname
 Honan, Burma, a town in Shan State
 Honan Chapel, in Cork, Ireland

See also
 Hunan, a Chinese province